Magic Bus may refer to:

Transport
 Magic Bus (Stagecoach), a bus service in the United Kingdom
 Bus 142 on the Stampede Trail near Healy, Alaska, United States, where Christopher McCandless camped and died--also known as "The Magic Bus"

Arts, entertainment, and media

Music
 Magic Bus: The Who on Tour, a 1968 album by The Who
 "Magic Bus" (song), a 1968 song by The Who
 "Magic Bus", a 2002 song by Kottonmouth Kings from Rollin' Stoned

Other arts, entertainment, and media
 Magic Bus (studio), a Japanese animation studio founded in 1977
 The Magic School Bus, a series of children's books and a TV series